The following are the association football events of the year 1978 throughout the world.

Events
Copa Libertadores 1978: Won by Boca Juniors after defeating Deportivo Cali on an aggregate score of 4–0.
 England: Ipswich Town win the cup beating Arsenal F.C. 1–0 with the winning goal scored by Roger Osborne

Winners club national championship

Asia
 : Maccabi Tel Aviv F.C.
 : Al-Rayyan SC

Europe
 : Nottingham Forest
 : AS Monaco
 : Újpest FC
 : Juventus
 :
Eredivisie – PSV Eindhoven
Eerste Divisie – PEC Zwolle
 : Steaua București
 : Real Madrid
 : Rangers
 : Fenerbahçe

North America
: Tigres UANL
 / :
 New York Cosmos (NASL)

Oceania
: West Adelaide

South America
 
Metropolitano – Quilmes
Nacional – Independiente
 : Guarani
 : Olimpia Asunción

International tournaments
 African Cup of Nations in Ghana (March 5 – 16 1978)
 
 
 
1978 British Home Championship (May 13 – May 20, 1978)

 FIFA World Cup in Argentina (June 1 – 25 1978)

Births

January
 January 9 
 Gennaro Gattuso, Italian football player
 Hamlet Barrientos, Bolivian footballer
 January 10 – Jeffrey Yishai, former Israeli footballer
 January 20 – Salvatore Aronica, Italian footballer and manager
 January 28
 Gianluigi Buffon, Italian international goalkeeper
 Jamie Carragher, English football player defender
 Papa Bouba Diop, Senegalese footballer (d. 2020)

February
 February 2 – Barry Ferguson, Scottish footballer and coach
 February 5 – Jairon Zamora, Ecuadorian footballer
 February 15 – Alejandro Lembo, Uruguayan footballer
 February 24 – Leon Constantine, English club footballer

March
 March 9 – Lucas Neill, Australian footballer
 March 11 – Didier Drogba, Ivorian international
 March 24 – Tomáš Ujfaluši, Czech footballer
 March 30 – Mauricio Rojas, Chilean footballer
 March 31
 Stephen Clemence, English footballer and coach
 Jérôme Rothen, French international

April
 April 1 – Antonio de Nigris, Mexican international striker (d. 2009)
 April 30 – Simone Barone, Italian footballer

May
 May 16 – Edu, Brazilian football player and manager
 May 30 – Nicolás Olivera, Uruguayan footballer

June
 June 20 – Frank Lampard, English football player midfielder
 June 9 – Miroslav Klose, German football player forward
 June 21 – Hatem Aqel, Jordanian footballer

July
 July 22 – Dennis Rommedahl, Danish footballer

September

 September 6 – Éric Kossingou, French former professional footballer
 September 17 – Arne Slot, Dutch football player and manager
 September 18 
 Ryan Lowe, English club footballer 
 Augustine Simo, Cameroonian footballer
 September 22 – Harry Kewell, Australian football player

November
 November 7 – Rio Ferdinand, English football player defender
 November 7 – Jan Vennegoor of Hesselink, Dutch footballer
 November 8 – Ali Karimi, Iranian footballer
 November 11 – Erik Edman, Swedish footballer

December
 December 5 – Marcelo Zalayeta, Uruguayan footballer
 December 17 – Patricia Pérez, Mexican female footballer
 December 23 – Nicolás Suárez, Bolivian footballer
 December 29 – Victor Agali, Nigerian footballer
 December 29 – Kieron Dyer, English footballer

Deaths

January
 January 3 – Rubén Morán, Uruguayan striker, winner of the 1950 FIFA World Cup. (47)

May
 May 8 – Juan Evaristo, Argentine midfielder, runner up of the 1930 FIFA World Cup, part of the first sibling to ever play a World Cup Final. (75)

June
 June 2 – Santiago Bernabéu (82), Spanish footballer, coach and president.

July
 July 13 – George Reader (81), English football referee

August
 August 5 – Ernst Melchior, Austrian footballer
 August 11 – Mario Varglien, Italian midfielder, winner of the 1934 FIFA World Cup. (72)
 August 15 – Leo Lemešić, Croatian football player and manager
 August 31 – Ángel Bossio, Argentine Goalkeeper, runner-up of the 1930 FIFA World Cup. (73)

September
 September 15 – Ricardo Zamora, Spanish footballer
 September 25 – Luigi Allemandi, Italian defender, winner of the 1934 FIFA World Cup. (74)

November
 November 18 – Pablo Dorado, Uruguayan striker, winner of the 1930 FIFA World Cup and first player ever to score in a World Cup Final. (70)

December
 December 5 – Carlos Riolfo, Uruguayan midfielder, winner of the 1930 FIFA World Cup. (73)

References

 
Association football by year